The Surf Ranch Pro is a professional surfing competition, currently one of the events of the World Surf League. The competition is held annually at Kelly Slater's Surf Ranch in Lemoore, California. Held for the first time in 2018, it was the first World Surf League event to be staged in an artificial wave pool. The event was rebranded as the 'Freshwater Pro' in 2019, but returned to its original name and is officially the Jeep Surf Ranch Pro presented by Adobe.

Results

Men

Women

References

External links

World Surf League

 
World Surf League
Surfing competitions in California
2018 establishments in California
Recurring sporting events established in 2018
Sports in Lemoore, California